The assassination of Reinhard Heydrich, who was the commander of the German Reich Security Main Office (RSHA), the acting governor of the Protectorate of Bohemia and Moravia, and a principal architect of the Holocaust, was a coordinated operation by the Czechoslovak resistance during World War II. The assassination attempt, code-named Operation Anthropoid, was carried out by resistance operatives Jozef Gabčík and Jan Kubiš on 27 May 1942. Heydrich was wounded in the attack and died of his wounds on 4 June 1942.

The operatives who carried out the assassination were soldiers of the Czechoslovak Army who were prepared and trained by the British Special Operations Executive with the approval of the Czechoslovak government-in-exile, led by Edvard Beneš. The Czechoslovaks undertook the operation to help confer legitimacy on the government-in-exile, and to exact retribution for Heydrich's brutal rule. The operation was the only verified government-sponsored assassination of a senior Nazi leader during the Second World War. Heydrich's death led to a wave of reprisals by SS troops, including the destruction of villages and mass killings of civilians.

Multiple memorials have been created in different nations such as in the Czech Republic, Slovakia and in the United Kingdom as a result of both the assassination and its aftermath. In addition, the events have been featured in several well-known dramatic films (this taking place in the general context of World War II in popular culture and specifically Reinhard Heydrich in popular culture).

Background

Protectorate of Bohemia and Moravia
Reinhard Heydrich had been the chief of the Reich Main Security Office (RSHA) since September 1939 and was appointed acting Protector of Bohemia and Moravia after replacing Konstantin von Neurath in September 1941. Hitler agreed with Reichsführer-SS Heinrich Himmler and Heydrich that von Neurath's relatively lenient approach to the Czechs promoted anti-German sentiment, and encouraged anti-German resistance by strikes and sabotage.

Heydrich came to Prague to "strengthen policy, carry out countermeasures against resistance", and keep up production quotas of Czech motors and arms that were "extremely important to the German war effort". During his role as de facto dictator of Bohemia and Moravia, Heydrich often drove with his chauffeur in a car with an open roof. This was a show of his confidence in the occupation forces and in the effectiveness of his government. Due to his brutal efficiency, Heydrich was nicknamed the Butcher of Prague, the Blond Beast, and the Hangman.

Strategic context

By late 1941, Germany under Hitler controlled almost all of continental Europe, and German forces were approaching Moscow. The Allies deemed Soviet capitulation likely. The exiled government of Czechoslovakia under President Edvard Beneš was under pressure from British intelligence, as there had been very little visible resistance since the occupation of the Sudeten regions of the country in 1938. The takeover of these regions was accepted by the United Kingdom and France in the Munich Agreement. Occupation of the whole country had begun in 1939, and the initial betrayal, with the subsequent terror of the German Reich seemed to break the will of the Czechs for a period. The German invasion of the Soviet Union had stimulated acts of sabotage by Czech communists, leading to Heydrich's appointment. As well as terrorizing the opposition and establishing the Theresienstadt ghetto/concentration camp, Heydrich had overseen a progressive policy of good wages (equivalent to those in Germany) for industrial workers and farmers, which had a pacifying effect (acts of sabotage dropped by three-quarters in six months) and helped cooperative production of war materials. Heydrich was thought to be scheduled to transfer to occupied northern France and Belgium, with the intent to implement similar policies there.

Resistance movements were active from the very beginning of occupation in several other countries defeated in open warfare (Poland, Yugoslavia, and Greece), but the subjugated Czech lands remained relatively calm and produced significant amounts of materiel for Nazi Germany. The exiled government felt that it had to do something that would inspire the Czechoslovaks, as well as show the world that the Czechs and Slovaks were allies. In particular, Beneš felt that a dramatic action displaying a Czech contribution to the Allied cause would make it politically harder for the British to forge any possible peace agreement with Germany that would undermine Czech national interests. Heydrich was chosen over Karl Hermann Frank as an assassination target due to his status as the acting Protector of Bohemia and Moravia as well as his reputation for terrorizing local citizens. The operation was also intended to demonstrate to senior Nazis that they were not beyond the reach of Allied forces and the resistance groups they supported.

Operation

Planning
The operation was initiated by František Moravec, head of the Czechoslovak intelligence services, with the knowledge and approval of Beneš, almost as soon as Heydrich was appointed Protector. Moravec personally briefed Brigadier Colin Gubbins, who at the time was the Director of Operations in the British Special Operations Executive (SOE) and who had responsibility for the Czech and Polish "country" sections of the organisation. Gubbins readily agreed to help mount the operation, although knowledge of it was restricted to a few of the headquarters and training staff of SOE. The operation was given the codename Anthropoid, Greek for "having the form of a human", a term usually used in zoology.

Preparation began on 20 October 1941. Moravec had personally selected two dozen of the most promising personnel from among the 2,000 exiled Czechoslovak soldiers based in Britain. They were sent to one of SOE's commando training centres at Arisaig in Scotland. Warrant Officer Jozef Gabčík (Slovak) and Staff Sergeant Karel Svoboda (cs) (Czech) were chosen to carry out the operation on 28 October 1941 (Czechoslovakia's Independence Day), but after Svoboda received a head injury during training, he was replaced by Jan Kubiš (Czech). This caused delays in the mission as Kubiš had not completed training, nor had the necessary false documents been prepared for him.

Training was supervised by the nominated head of the Czech section, Major Alfgar Hesketh-Prichard, who turned to Cecil Clarke to develop the necessary weapon, light enough to throw but still be lethal to an armour-plated Mercedes. During extensive training, the new weapon was found to be easy to throw by Hesketh-Prichard, who had a strong cricketing background, his father having been a first-class bowler, but less so by Gabčík and Kubiš.

Insertion

Gabčík and Kubiš, with seven other soldiers from Czechoslovakia's army-in-exile in the United Kingdom in two other groups named Silver A and Silver B (who had different missions), were flown from RAF Tangmere by a Halifax of No. 138 Squadron RAF at 22:00 on 28 December 1941. The groups, along with some supply containers, left the plane by parachute, in drops in three separate areas. The Anthropoid pair landed near Nehvizdy east of Prague. Originally, the plane had been planned to land near Pilsen, but the aircrew had navigation problems and each of the groups landed in different places from where intended. Gabčík and Kubiš then moved to Pilsen to contact their allies, and from there on to Prague, where the attack was planned.

In Prague, the pair contacted several families and Czechoslovak resistance organisations who helped them during the preparations for the assassination. Upon learning of the nature of the mission, resistance leaders begged the Czechoslovak government-in-exile to call off the attack, saying that "[a]n attempt against Heydrich's life... would be of no use to the Allies and its consequences for our people would be immeasurable". Beneš personally broadcast a message insisting that the attack go forward, although he denied any involvement after the war. Professor Vojtěch Mastný argues that he "clung to the scheme as the last resort to dramatize Czech resistance".

Gabčík and Kubiš initially planned to kill Heydrich on a train, but after examination of the practicalities, they realised this was not going to be possible. A second plan was to kill him on a forest road that led from Heydrich's home to Prague. They planned to pull a cable across the road that would stop Heydrich's car, but after waiting several hours, their commander, Lt. Adolf Opálka (from the group Out Distance), came to bring them back to Prague. A third plan was to kill Heydrich in Prague.

Attack in Prague

At 10:30 on 27 May 1942, Heydrich started his daily commute from his home in Panenské Břežany, 14 km (9 mi) north of central Prague, to his headquarters at Prague Castle. He was driven by SS-Oberscharführer Johannes Klein. The tight curve there would force Heydrich's car to slow down as it turned westwards into . Josef Valčík (from group Silver A) was positioned about 100 m (109 yards) north of Gabčík and Kubiš to look out for the approaching car.

Heydrich's green, open-topped Mercedes 320 Cabriolet B reached the curve two minutes later. As it slowed down and rounded the corner, Gabčík, who concealed his Sten submachine gun under a raincoat, dropped the raincoat and raised the gun, and, at close range, tried to shoot Heydrich, but the gun jammed. As the car passed, Heydrich made an ultimately fatal error; instead of ordering his driver to accelerate, he stood up and drew his Luger pistol, yelling at the driver to halt.

As the Mercedes braked in front of him, Kubiš, who was not spotted by Heydrich or Klein, threw a modified anti-tank grenade (concealed in a briefcase) at the car; he misjudged his throw. Instead of landing inside the Mercedes, it landed against the rear wheel. Nonetheless, the bomb severely wounded Heydrich when it detonated, its fragments ripping through the right rear fender and embedding fragmentation and fibers from the upholstery of the car into Heydrich, causing serious injuries to his left side, with major damage to his diaphragm, spleen, and lung, as well as a fractured rib.

Kubiš received a minor wound to his face from the shrapnel. The explosion shattered the windows of the tram, which had stopped on the opposite side of the road, shrapnel striking terrified passengers. Two SS jackets that had been folded on the back seat of the car were whirled upwards by the blast and draped themselves over the trolley wire.

Heydrich and Klein leapt out of the shattered Mercedes with drawn pistols; Klein ran towards Kubiš, who had staggered against the railings, while Heydrich went to Gabčík, who stood paralyzed holding the Sten. As Klein came towards him, Kubiš recovered, jumped on his bicycle and pedaled away, scattering passengers spilling from the tram by firing in the air with his Colt M1903 pistol. Klein tried to shoot at him, but dazed by the explosion, pressed the magazine release catch and the gun jammed.

A staggering Heydrich came towards Gabčík, who dropped his Sten and tried to reach his bicycle, but was forced to abandon the attempt and took cover behind a telegraph pole, firing at Heydrich with his pistol. Heydrich returned fire and ducked behind the stalled tram. Suddenly, Heydrich doubled over and staggered to the side of the road in pain. He then collapsed against the railings, holding himself up with one hand. As Gabčík took the opportunity to run, Klein returned from his fruitless chase of Kubiš to help his wounded superior.

Heydrich, his face pale and contorted in pain, pointed toward the fleeing Slovak, saying, "Get that bastard!" As Klein gave pursuit, Heydrich stumbled along the pavement before collapsing against the bonnet of his wrecked car. Gabčík fled into a butcher shop, where the owner, a man named Brauer, who was a Nazi sympathizer and had a brother who worked for the Gestapo, ignored Gabčík's request for help. He ran out to the street and attracted Klein's attention by shouting and pointing inside the shop.

Klein, whose gun was still jammed, ran into the shop and collided with Gabčík in the doorway. In the confusion, Gabčík shot him twice, severely wounding him in the leg. Gabčík then escaped in a tram, reaching a local safe house. At this point, Gabčík and Kubiš did not know that Heydrich was wounded and thought the attack had failed.

Medical treatment and death

A Czech woman and an off-duty policeman went to Heydrich's aid and flagged down a delivery van. Heydrich was first placed in the driver's cab, but complained that the truck's movement was causing him pain. He was then transferred to the back of the truck on his stomach and taken to the emergency room at Bulovka Hospital. A Dr. Slanina packed the chest wound, while Dr. Walter Diek, the Sudeten German chief of surgery at the hospital, tried to remove the shrapnel splinters.

Professor Hollbaum (a Silesian German who was chairman of surgery at Charles University in Prague) operated on Heydrich with Diek and Slanina's assistance. The surgeons reinflated the collapsed left lung, removed the tip of the fractured 11th rib, sutured the torn diaphragm, inserted several catheters, and removed the spleen, which contained a grenade fragment and upholstery. Heydrich's superior, Heinrich Himmler, sent his personal physician, Karl Gebhardt, who flew to Prague and arrived that evening. After 29 May, Heydrich was entirely in the care of SS physicians. Postoperative care included administration of large amounts of morphine.

Contradictory accounts exist concerning whether sulfanilamide, a new antibacterial drug, was given; Gebhardt testified at his 1947 war crimes trial that it was not. Theodor Morell, Hitler's doctor, suggested its use, but Gebhardt, thinking Heydrich was recovering, declined. Heydrich developed a fever of 38–39 °C (100.4–102.2 °F) and wound drainage, and he was in great pain. Despite the fever, his recovery appeared to progress well. On 2 June, during a visit by Himmler, Heydrich reconciled himself to his fate by reciting a part of one of his father's operas:

Heydrich's condition appeared to be improving, until while sitting up eating a noon meal on 3 June, he suddenly collapsed and went into shock. He soon slipped into a deep coma and never regained consciousness, dying on 4 June around 04:30. An autopsy concluded he died of sepsis. Heydrich's facial expression as he died betrayed an "uncanny spirituality and entirely perverted beauty, like a renaissance Cardinal" according to Bernhard Wehner, a Kriminalpolizei police official who investigated the assassination.

One of the theories was that some of the horsehair in the upholstery of Heydrich's car was forced into his body by the blast of the grenade, causing a systemic infection. Another suggestion was that Heydrich died of a massive pulmonary embolism (probably a fat embolism). In support of the latter possibility, particles of fat and blood clots were found at autopsy in the right ventricle and pulmonary artery and severe oedema was noted in the upper lobes of the lungs, while the lower lobes were collapsed.

Botulinum poisoning theory
The authors of A Higher Form of Killing claim that Heydrich died from botulism (Clostridium botulinum toxin poisoning). According to this theory, based on statements made by Paul Fildes, a Porton Down botulism researcher, the No. 73 anti-tank grenade used in the attack had been modified to contain the toxin. The authors say that only circumstantial evidence supports this allegation; the records of the SOE for the period have remained sealed and few medical records of Heydrich's condition and treatment have been preserved.

The evidence cited to support the theory includes the modifications made to the No. 73 grenade; the bottom two-thirds of this weapon had been removed, and the open end and sides were wrapped up with adhesive tape. The modification of the weapon could indicate an attached toxic or biological agent. Heydrich received excellent medical care by the standards of the time. His post mortem examination showed none of the usual signs of sepsis, although infection of the wound and areas surrounding the lungs and heart was reported. A German wartime report on the incident stated, "[d]eath occurred as a consequence of lesions in the vital parenchymatous organs caused by bacteria and possibly by poisons carried into them by bomb splinters".

Heydrich's condition while hospitalized was not documented in detail, but he was not noted to have developed any of the distinctive symptoms associated with botulism, which have a gradual onset, invariably including paralysis, with death generally resulting from respiratory failure. Two others were also wounded by fragments of the same grenade – Kubiš, the Czech soldier who threw the grenade, and a bystander – but neither was reported to have shown any sign of poisoning.

The botulinum toxin theory has not found widespread acceptance among scholars. Fildes had a reputation for "extravagant boasts" and the grenade modifications could have been aimed at making the  weapon lighter. Two of the six original modified grenades are kept by the Military History Institute in Prague.

Consequences

Reprisals

Hitler ordered an investigation and reprisals on the day of the assassination attempt, suggesting that Himmler send SS General Erich von dem Bach-Zelewski to Prague. According to Karl Hermann Frank's postwar testimony, Hitler knew Zelewski to be even harsher than Heydrich. Hitler favoured killing 10,000 politically unreliable Czechs, but after he consulted Himmler, the idea was dropped because Czech territory was an important industrial zone for the German military, and indiscriminate killing could reduce the productivity of the region.

According to one estimate, 5,000 people were murdered in the reprisals. More than 13,000 people were arrested, including Jan Kubiš' girlfriend Anna Malinová, who died in the Mauthausen-Gusen concentration camp. Adolf Opálka's aunt, Marie Opálková, was executed in the Mauthausen camp on 24 October 1942; his father Viktor Jarolím was also killed. 

Nazi intelligence falsely linked Heydrich's assassins to the village of Lidice. A Gestapo report suggested Lidice was the hiding place of the assassins, since several Czech army officers exiled in England were known to have come from there. On 9 June 1942, the Germans committed the Lidice massacre; 199 men were killed, 195 women were deported to Ravensbrück concentration camp, and 95 children taken prisoner. Of the children, 81 were later killed in gas vans at the Chełmno extermination camp, while eight were adopted by German families. The Czech village of Ležáky was also destroyed because a radio transmitter belonging to the Silver A team was found there. The men and women of Ležáky were murdered, both villages were burned, and the ruins of Lidice were levelled.

Investigation and manhunt

In the days following the Lidice massacre, no leads were found for those responsible for Heydrich's death. A deadline was issued to the military and the people of Czechoslovakia for the assassins to be apprehended by 18 June 1942. If they were not caught by then, the Germans threatened to spill far more blood, believing that this threat would be enough to force a potential informant to sell out the culprits. Many civilians were indeed wary and fearful of further reprisals, making hiding information much longer increasingly difficult. The assailants initially hid with two Prague families and later took refuge in the Cathedral of Sts Cyril and Methodius (until 1935 the Karel Boromejsky Church) a cathedral of the Czech and Slovak Orthodox Church in Prague. The Germans were unable to locate the attackers until Karel Čurda of the Out Distance sabotage group turned himself in to the Gestapo and gave up the names of the team's local contacts for the bounty of one million Reichsmarks.

Čurda betrayed several safe houses provided by the Jindra group, including that of the Moravec family in Žižkov. At 05:00 on 17 June, the Moravec flat was raided. The family was made to stand in the hallway while the Gestapo searched their flat. Marie Moravec was allowed to go to the toilet, where she bit into a cyanide capsule and killed herself. Alois Moravec was unaware of his family's involvement with the resistance; he was taken to the Petschek Palace together with his 17-year-old son Vlastimil, or "Ata", who was tortured throughout the day, but refused to talk. The youth was stupefied with brandy, shown his mother's severed head in a fish tank, and warned that, if he did not talk, his father would be next; Ata gave in. Ata was executed by the Nazis in Mauthausen on 24 October 1942, the same day as his father, his fiancée, her mother, and her brother.

Waffen-SS troops laid siege to the church the following day, but they were unable to take the assailants alive, despite the best efforts of 750 SS soldiers under the command of SS-Gruppenführer Karl Fischer von Treuenfeld. They also brought along Čurda, who tried to get them to surrender by shouting: "" to which the paratroopers fired back and shouted: "" Adolf Opálka and Josef Bublík were killed in the prayer loft after a two-hour gun battle, and Kubiš was reportedly found unconscious after the battle and died shortly after from his injuries. Gabčík, Josef Valčík, Jaroslav Švarc, and Jan Hrubý killed themselves in the crypt after repeated SS attacks, attempts to force them out with tear gas, and fire brigade trucks brought in to try to flood the crypt. The SS report about the fight mentioned five wounded SS soldiers. The men in the church had only pistols, while the attackers had machine guns, submachine guns, and hand grenades. After the battle, Čurda confirmed the identity of the dead Czech resistance fighters, including Kubiš and Gabčík.

Bishop Gorazd took the blame for the actions in the church to minimize the reprisals among his flock, and even wrote letters to the Nazi authorities, who arrested him on 27 June 1942 and tortured him. On 4 September 1942, the bishop, the church's priests and senior lay leaders were taken to Kobylisy Shooting Range in a northern suburb of Prague and shot. For his actions, Bishop Gorazd was later glorified as a martyr by the Eastern Orthodox Church.

Aftermath

Two large funeral ceremonies were held for Heydrich as one of the most important Nazi leaders, first in Prague, where the way to Prague Castle was lined by thousands of SS men with torches, and then in Berlin attended by all high-ranking Nazi figures. Hitler attended the Berlin ceremony and placed the German Order and Blood Order medals on Heydrich's funeral pillow.

The assassination of Heydrich was one of the most significant moments of the resistance in Czechoslovakia.  Traitor Karel Čurda was hanged for high treason in 1947 after attempting suicide. On 5 August 1942, British foreign secretary Anthony Eden issued a declaration that Germany had destroyed the Munich Agreement. However, the declaration did not commit the UK to Czechoslovakia's pre-Munich borders and did not declare the Munich agreement void ab initio as Czechoslovakia wanted, thus the statement has been questioned as a full repudiation of the deal. A September 1942 declaration by the French National Committee suggested that the agreement was void ab initio as it had come about under threat of aggression and recognizing no changes in Czechoslovakia's borders since 1938.

Neither the Czech government-in-exile nor the British SOE likely foresaw the possibility that the Germans would apply the principle of Sippenhaft (collective responsibility) on the scale they did in avenging Heydrich's assassination. Moreover, decisions about whether to conduct assassinations of this kind are resistant to a rational choice process, as computing the probability of success or the likely benefits and costs involved is inherently difficult, and even if it were possible, the benefits (in this case, the diplomatic value of British repudiation of the Munich Agreement) are not in a form that Beneš could readily compare against the nature of the costs (the loss of Czech civilian lives). British Prime Minister Winston Churchill was infuriated enough by the scale of reprisals to suggest levelling three German villages for every Czech village that the Nazis destroyed. Two years after Heydrich's death, Operation Foxley, a similar assassination plan, was drawn up against Hitler, but not implemented.

Operation Anthropoid was the only successful government-organized assassination of a top-ranking Nazi official. The Polish underground killed two senior SS officers in the General Government in Operation Kutschera and Operation Bürkl; Wilhelm Kube, the General-kommissar of Belarus, was killed in Operation Blowup by Soviet partisan Yelena Mazanik, a Belarusian woman who had managed to find employment in his household to kill him.

Memorials

The soldiers of Operation Anthropoid, their helpers, and the operation itself were memorialized in the Czech Republic and abroad. The oldest memorial is a plaque on Orthodox Cathedral of Saints Cyril and Methodius in Resslova Street, Prague. It was created in 1947 by an ex-soldier of the Czechoslovak army-in-exile, František Bělský and is dedicated to the paratroopers, the clergymen, and other Czech patriots who died for the sake of the operation.

The National Memorial to the Heroes of the Heydrich Terror was created beneath the Cathedral of Saints Cyril and Methodius in 1995. Later, it underwent significant reconstruction and the extended exposition was reopened in 2010.

Another important monument is in the form of a fountain, and symbolically commemorates the seven paratroopers. It was installed in 1968 in the Jephson Gardens, Leamington Spa (UK). The headquarters of the Czechoslovak military training camp during World War II were in Leamington.

The Slovak National Museum opened an exhibition in May 2007 to commemorate the heroes of the Czech and Slovak resistance, one of the most important resistance actions in the whole of German-occupied Europe.

The Anthropoid Operation Memorial, 2009, Prague, authors: sculptor David Mojescik and sculptor Michal Smeral; architects: M. Tumova and J. Gulbis.

Also, a memorial has been placed in Arisaig, Scotland, to the Czechoslovakian members of SOE who trained in that area, with a list of those killed and the missions in which they took part.

In October 2011, a memorial plaque was unveiled on residential block Porchester Gate (London), which housed the Czechoslovak military intelligence service and where the Operation Anthropoid was planned in October 1941.

Portrayals in literature and popular culture

Literature
Jiří Weil's 1959 book Mendelssohn is on the Roof features the assassination of Reinhard Heydrich as a subplot.

The story of Operation Anthropoid is narrated in a short Czech comic book titled Atentát (The Assassination), created in 1976 by brothers Jan Saudek and Kája Saudek. It was published in 1976 in the Polish comic-book magazine Relax, as Zamach (The Assassination).

The alternate history novel The Man with the Iron Heart by Harry Turtledove is based on the premise that Heydrich survived the 1942 assassination attempt, and led a postwar insurgency campaign, using the Werwolf.

Jiří Šulc's novel Dva proti Říši (literally Two Men Against The Empire) describes the events long before the assassination, assassination itself, its consequences and a detailed look at the life of the Czech resistance and exiled paratroopers in the Protectorate.

Laurent Binet's novel HHhH (Himmlers Hirn heißt Heydrich, or "Himmler's brain is called Heydrich"), published in 2010 by Grasset & Fasquelle, chronicles the lives of Reinhard Heydrich and his assassins Jozef Gabčík and Jan Kubiš.

Movies
The following is a list of the movies dealing with Operation Anthropoid or portraying the assassination as a crucial moment of the film's plot:
 Hangmen Also Die! (1943)
 Hitler's Madman (1943)
 Muži bez křídel (1946)
 Atentát (1964)
 Sokolovo (1975)
 Operation Daybreak (1975)
 Protector (2009)
 Lidice (2011)
 Bullet for Heydrich (2013 TV movie)
 Anthropoid (2016)
 The Man with the Iron Heart (2017)

Songs

There are two Czech songs about operation Anthropoid. 

One is by Jan Vyčítal, from Czech country band Greenhorns, called Battledress (2006). 

Second is from Daniel Landa, called Anička Malinová (2022; Anna Malinová was Gabčík’s girlfriend. She was executed by Nazis in Mauthausen)

Gallery
Ss. Cyril and Methodius Cathedral is where the Czechoslovak paratroopers died after being cornered, and the memorial there is for those killed by the SS in retaliation for Operation Anthropoid.

See also

Aston House - Station XII
Czech resistance to Nazi occupation
 Occupation of Czechoslovakia
 Operation Kutschera – Polish assassination of the SS and Police Leader Franz Kutschera in 1944
 List of Nazi Party leaders and officials
 List of rulers of the Protectorate Bohemia and Moravia

References

Further reading

External links

 National Memorial to the Heroes of the Heydrich Terror
 Radio Prague: Czechs in World War II
 Radio Prague: Exhibitions mark 60th anniversary of assassination of Nazi governor Heydrich
 Operation Anthropoid at Everything2
 Czechs in Exile website
 Exhibition on Operation Anthropoid at the Slovak Nation Museum
 The Prague Daily Monitor: Experts find wartime paratroopers' grave
 RCAHMS record for Arisaig memorial
 Highland HER entry for Arisaig memorial

 
1942 murders in Europe
1942 in Czechoslovakia
20th century in Prague
Conflicts in 1942
Czechoslovakia in World War II
History of Prague
Military assassinations
Military operations of World War II involving Germany
Reinhard Heydrich
Special Operations Executive operations
World War II operations and battles of Europe
May 1942 events
Covert operations
Code names
People killed in United Kingdom intelligence operations